Norled (earlier Tide Sjø AS) is a Norwegian shipping company responsible for the group's ferry transport. Tide operates automobile ferries and fast ferries in Rogaland, Vestland, Sunnmøre and Trondheim Fjord on contract with the Norwegian Public Roads Administration, Kolumbus and Skyss. The company operates 45 car ferries, 17 fast ferries and one water bus.

The name Tide Sjø was first used by HSD Sjø AS after Hardanger Sunnhordlandske Dampskipsselskap had merged with Gaia Trafikk. In 2007 Tide Sjø merged with Stavangerske, its subsidiary Fjordservice and the Tide–Stavangerske joint venture Nor-Ferjer. After fissioning from Tide in December 2011, the company changed the name to Norled on 1 January 2012.

Fleet

See also
Flekkefjord Dampskipsselskap

References

Shipping companies of Norway
Ferry companies of Møre og Romsdal
Ferry companies of Rogaland
Ferry companies of Trøndelag
Ferry companies of Vestland
Companies based in Bergen
Norwegian companies established in 2007
Transport companies established in 2007